Matt Van Buren (born June 12, 1986) is an American mixed martial artist who competed in the light heavyweight division for the Ultimate Fighting Championship. Van Buren has also fought for Bellator and was a finalist on The Ultimate Fighter 19.

Mixed martial arts career

Early career
Van Buren made his debut in 2010, he won his first three bouts against Manny Okorie, Aaron Johnson and Brandon Saling.

Bellator
Van Buren made his Bellator debut in October 2011, defeating Nick Nichols via TKO in the second round at Bellator 52.

The following November, Van Buren faced Shawn Levesque at Bellator 57. Van Buren won via rear-naked choke submission in the first round.

Van Buren then fought Mike Mucitelli on August 24, 2012 at Bellator 73. Van Buren lost via submission in the first round.

On November 30, 2012, Van Buren faced Terry Davinney at Bellator 82 and lost via KO in just 15 seconds.

Post-Bellator
After his run in Bellator, Van Buren faced Mojtaba Najim Wali on July 20, 2013 at Gladiators of the Cage: The North Shore's Rise to Power 2. Van Buren won via unanimous decision breaking his two fight losing streak.

The Ultimate Fighter
On March 25, 2014 it was announced that Van Buren would appear on The Ultimate Fighter: Team Edgar vs. Team Penn.

In the fight to get into the house, Van Buren faced Daniel Vizcaya. Van Buren won via KO and was picked by Frankie Edgar to be on his team.

Van Buren then faced Chris Fields in the elimination round. Despite being rocked with a punch in the second round by Fields, Van Buren won via unanimous decision and moved on to the semifinals.

In the semifinals, Van Buren faced Daniel Spohn. After being rocked twice in the fight, Van Buren came back and won the fight via TKO in the second round.

Ultimate Fighting Championship
In the finals of The Ultimate Fighter 19, Van Buren faced Corey Anderson at The Ultimate Fighter 19 Finale on July 6, 2014. Van Buren lost the bout via TKO in the first round.

Van Buren faced Sean O'Connell on January 18, 2015 at UFC Fight Night 59. He lost the fight via TKO in the third round.  Despite the loss, he was awarded a Fight of the Night bonus award.

Van Buren was briefly linked to a bout with Jonathan Wilson on August 8, 2015 at UFC Fight Night 74.  However, Van Buren was removed from the card in early June citing injury and replaced by Jared Cannonier.

In October 2015 Van Buren was released by the UFC.

Championships and accomplishments

Mixed martial arts
Ultimate Fighting Championship
The Ultimate Fighter 19 (Runner-Up)
Fight of the Night (One time) vs. Sean O'Connell

Mixed martial arts record

|-
|Loss
|align=center|7–6
|Todd Stoute
|Decision (Unanimous)
|BTC 1 - Genesis
|
|align=center|3
|align=center|5:00
|Toronto, Canada
|

|-
|Loss
|align=center|7–5
|Jeremy Kimball
|KO (Punch)
|FFC 24 - Villefort vs. Rela
|
|align=center|1
|align=center|0:14
|Daytona Beach, Florida, United States
|
|-
|Win
|align=center|7–4
|Derrick Weaver
|Submission (arm-triangle choke)
|Elite Warrior Challenge 9: Takeover
|
|align=center|2
|align=center|3:38
|Salem, Virginia, United States
|
|-
|Loss
|align=center|6–4
|Sean O'Connell
|TKO (punches)
|UFC Fight Night: McGregor vs. Siver
|
|align=center|3
|align=center|2:11
|Boston, Massachusetts, United States
|
|-
|Loss
|align=center|6–3
|Corey Anderson
|TKO (punches)
|The Ultimate Fighter: Team Edgar vs. Team Penn Finale
|
|align=center|1
|align=center|1:01
|Las Vegas, Nevada, United States
|
|-
|Win
|align=center|6–2
|Mojtaba Najim Wali
|Decision (unanimous)
|Gladiators of the Cage: The North Shore's Rise to Power 2
|
|align=center|3
|align=center|5:00
|Pittsburgh, Pennsylvania, United States
|
|-
|Loss
|align=center|5–2
|Terry Davinney
|KO (punch)
|Bellator 82
|
|align=center|1
|align=center|0:15
|Mount Pleasant, Michigan, United States
|
|-
|Loss
|align=center|5–1
|Mike Mucitelli
|Submission (triangle choke)
|Bellator 73
|
|align=center|1
|align=center|3:01
|Tunica, Mississippi, United States 
|
|-
|Win
|align=center|5–0
|Shawn Levesque
|Submission (rear-naked choke)
|Bellator 57
|
|align=center|1
|align=center|4:38
|Rama, Ontario, Canada
|
|-
|Win
|align=center|4–0
|Nick Nichols
|TKO (punches)
|Bellator 52
|
|align=center|2
|align=center|2:29
|Lake Charles, Louisiana, United States
|
|-
|Win
|align=center|3–0
|Brandon Saling
|Decision (unanimous)
|Fight Night in the Cage 2
|
|align=center|3
|align=center|5:00
|Lancaster, Pennsylvania, United States
|
|-
|Win
|align=center|2–0
|Aaron Johnson
|KO (punches)
|Black and Blue Entertainment: Rebel Invasion
|
|align=center|1
|align=center|N/A
|Tallapoosa, Georgia, United States
|
|-
|Win
|align=center|1–0
|Manny Okorie
|Decision (majority)
|Washington Combat: Battle of the Legends
|
|align=center|3
|align=center|5:00
|Washington D.C., United States
|

See also
 List of current UFC fighters
 List of male mixed martial artists

References

External links
 
 
 

Living people
American male mixed martial artists
Mixed martial artists utilizing Brazilian jiu-jitsu
Sportspeople from Norfolk, Virginia
Mixed martial artists from Virginia
1986 births
People from Chula Vista, California
Ultimate Fighting Championship male fighters
American practitioners of Brazilian jiu-jitsu